MG1 is:

 Moog Concertmate MG-1
 MG1 electric motor, Motor Generator No. 1 in Toyota Hybrid System
 A General Motors RPO code for the Getrag 282 transmission.
 Metal Gear 1

See also 
 MG2 (disambiguation)